Dimension Hatröss is the fourth studio album by the Canadian heavy metal band Voivod. It was released in 1988 on Noise Records and is a concept album which narrates the exploits of Voivod’s mascot cyborg Korgull. The cover concept and artwork was produced by drummer Michel Langevin. Estimated sales are more than 70,000 copies, worldwide.

The "Batman Theme"'s cover only appears on the CD version, it is not present on the original vinyl and cassette pressings. In 2017, Dimension Hatröss was added by the US magazine Rolling Stone to its Top 100 Metal Albums of All Time list at No. 78.

The word Hatröss is pronounced by singer Snake (Denis Bélanger) in French as the word atroce, meaning terrible or horrible.

Track listing
All songs were written by Voivod, except where indicated.

Personnel
Voivod
Snake (Denis Bélanger) - vocals
Piggy (Denis D'Amour) - guitar
Blacky (Jean-Yves Thériault) - bass
Away (Michel Langevin) - drums, artwork

Production
Harris Johns - producer, engineer, mixing

References

1988 albums
Voivod (band) albums
Noise Records albums
Concept albums
Albums produced by Harris Johns